Asli-Naqli is a 1962 Hindi film produced by L.B Lachman and L.B Thakur. The film is directed by Hrishikesh Mukherjee and stars Dev Anand, Sadhana, Leela Chitnis, Anwar Hussain, Sandhya Roy and Keshto Mukherjee. The film's music is by Shankar Jaikishan and the lyrics by Hasrat Jaipuri and Shailendra. The film became a box office hit.

Plot
Anand (Dev Anand) is a spoiled grandson of rich businessman Rai Bahadur (played by Nazir Hussain). His grandfather wants him to marry Rekha (Indira), only daughter and heiress of a rich man, in spite of Anand's disinterest for her. In the ensuring fight, Anand leaves his house to prove his worthiness and ends up in the streets of Bombay (present day Mumbai). There, Mohan (Anwar Hussain) meets Anand and takes Anand to his house in a poor neighborhood.

Anand settles himself there temporarily and tries to find work. He meets a beautiful, educated young woman Renu (Sadhana Shivdasani) and gets impressed with her. She helps him to find a job, but he soon loses it due to his incompetence. Renu works in a small company, but tells her mother (Leela Chitnis) that she is attending college. She lies to her mother that her father is sending them money. When Anand asks, she explains that she is hiding the fact that her father is dead as her mother can't tolerate that news. Anand further impresses her and asks Renu to marry him and she happily agrees.

But Rai Bahadur discovers Anand's whereabouts and meets him. He demands that Anand forget Renu and marry Rekha, to which Anand disagrees. Rai Bahadur blackmails Renu that he would tell her mother about her father's death if she wouldn't marry a different person. Having no other way, she agrees and tells Anand to forget her. Renu's mother overhears this conversation and understands that her husband is no more. She accepts her fate and tells Renu that she should marry according to her own wishes. Renu and Anand marry and at the end, Rai Bahadur accepts Renu and transfers all his property to her name.

Cast 
Sadhana Shivdasani as Renu
Dev Anand as Anand
Leela Chitnis as Renu's mother 
Nazir Hussain as Dwarkadas
Anwar Hussain as Mohan 
Sandhya Roy as Shanti 
Indira Billi as Rekha
Mukri as Nandu 
Keshto Mukherjee as Mr Gomes
Motilal as Colonel Mishra
Amol Sen as Ramu
Mehar Banu as Meenu
Shobha Sen
Polson as school bus conductor

Trivia
Hrishikesh Mukherjee as a director comes to maturity in this film and develops a signature style of healthy family entertainment. This film follows one of his earlier successes, Anari.

Innovative Song Picturisation:  In the expression of love, while filming the song "Ek But Banaunga", Hrishikesh Mukherjee took care that Dev Anand and Sadhana maintained a distance of at least 20 feet between them. At one time when they come nearer, there is a blackboard on a stand between them. When Dev Anand turns around the blackboard to Sadhana's side, the latter puts a slate between them. In the backdrop of rains outside, with Mohammed Rafi's magic all around, someone takes away a goat from the rain-sheltered veranda and one is transported to the dream world of love. At times Dev Anand is outside in the veranda with the bamboo mesh of a window between them. Dev is worshipping Sadhana with folded hands and in the end Sadhana comes near with her hands raised in blessing.

Similarly, while picturising the song "Tera Mera Pyaar Amar", Hrishikesh Mukherjee demonstrates the love between Dev Anand and Sadhana by putting them in different places as the song unfolds. In the early part of his career, Hrishikesh Mukherjee was a cinematographer and all through the film, there is brilliant camera work.

The song "Tujhe jeevan ki dori se" is also used in the movie Guddi in a dream sequence song featuring Dharmendra.

Highlights: There is a scene in which Nazir Hussain praises the workmanship of an artifact to Dev Anand when the latter is disturbed. The same scene would be repeated by Hrishikesh Mukherjee in the film Namak Haram (1973), between Om Shivpuri and Amitabh Bachchan.

In a single scene, Motilal, the character actor gives a brilliant performance by advising Dev Anand to let things go, rather than to control them. He asks Dev Anand in the club to hold sand in his palm and tells him: "If you would try to hold on to the sands, these would escape through your fingers. But if you keep your palm open, they would stay undisturbed."

In the scene when Sadhana is teaching English to the slum dwellers, she asks Dev Anand to spell and pronounce 'No' and gets into a funny argument about English pronunciations. A similar situation is repeated in 1975 film Chupke Chupke between Dharmendra and Om Prakash.

The film is refreshing with brilliant acting by all the cast and is very competently directed by Hrishikesh Mukherjee.

This film's story is partly inspired by The Definite Object, a 1917 romance novel by the British writer Jeffery Farnol.

Soundtrack

References

External links
 

1962 films
1960s Hindi-language films
Films directed by Hrishikesh Mukherjee
Films scored by Shankar–Jaikishan